Progress in Lipid Research is a quarterly peer-reviewed scientific journal that covers research on all aspects of research on lipids. The journal was established in 1973 with Ralph Holman (University of Minnesota) as founding editor-in-chief and is published by Elsevier. The current editors-in-chief are Makoto Arita (RIKEN), Kent Chapman (University of North Texas), John Harwood (Cardiff University), Gabor Tigyi (University of Tennessee Health Science Center), Markus Wenk (National University of Singapore).

Abstracting and indexing
The journal is abstracted and indexed in Chemical Abstract Service,  Science Citation Index Expanded, and Scopus. According to the Journal Citation Reports, the journal has a 2021 impact factor of 14.673.

References

External links

Biology journals
Quarterly journals
English-language journals
Publications established in 1973
Elsevier academic journals